"Caravan" is an American jazz standard that was composed by Juan Tizol and Duke Ellington and first performed by Ellington in 1936. Irving Mills wrote lyrics, but they are rarely sung.

Original recording
The first version of the song was recorded in Hollywood in 1936 and performed as an instrumental by Barney Bigard and His Jazzopators. Two takes were recorded, of which the first (Variety VA-515-1) was published. The band members were:
 Cootie Williams – trumpet
 Juan Tizol – trombone
 Barney Bigard – clarinet
 Harry Carney – baritone saxophone
 Duke Ellington – piano
 Billy Taylor – double bass
 Sonny Greer – drums

The musicians were members of the Duke Ellington Orchestra, which often split into smaller combinations to record songs under different band names. For this recording, which included Ellington and Tizol as performers, the session band leader was Bigard.

Other versions
The sound of "Caravan" interested exotica musicians; Martin Denny, Arthur Lyman, and Gordon Jenkins all covered it. The Mills Brothers recorded an a cappella version in which they imitated instruments with their voices. More than 350 versions have been recorded.
 Duke Ellington – New York, May 14, 1937
 Valaida Snow – Valaida Snow (vocal and trumpet) and her Orchestra, 1939, Sonora
 Art Tatum – Los Angeles, April–July 1940
Dizzy Gillespie – October 25, 1951
 Thelonious Monk – Thelonious Monk Plays Duke Ellington, Hackensack, New Jersey, July 27, 1955
 Nat King Cole – After Midnight, Los Angeles, September 14, 1956
 Santo & Johnny's – Santo & Johnny (1959), peaked at number 48 on the Billboard Hot 100 chart
 Art Blakey and the Jazz Messengers – Caravan, New York, October 23, 1962
 Wes Montgomery – Movin' Wes, New York, November 16, 1964
 Dizzy Gillespie and Oscar Peterson – Oscar Peterson and Dizzy Gillespie, London, November 28–29, 1974
 Les Paul & Chet Atkins – Chester and Lester, May 6–7, 1975
 Art Pepper – Friday Night at the Village Vanguard, New York, July 29, 1977
 Wynton Marsalis – Marsalis Standard Time, Vol. I, New York, May 29–30, 1986 and September 24–25, 1986
 Medeski Martin & Wood – Notes from the Underground, New York, December 15–16, 1991
 Michel Camilo – Rendezvous, New York, January 18–20, 1993
 Eva Cassidy – recorded live at the Blues Alley club, Washington, D.C. January 3, 1996, and released in her posthumous album Nightbird (2015)
 Fanfare Ciocărlia - Gili Garabdi, 2005
 Bobby Sanabria Multiverse Big Band – Vox Humana, recorded live at Dizzy's Club-Coca Cola, NYC, June 18-19, 2022

In popular culture
Woody Allen used the song in two of his films, Alice and Sweet and Lowdown. Steven Soderbergh used the Lyman version in his 2001 film Ocean's Eleven. The song is featured prominently in the 2014 film Whiplash as an important plot element. A horn sample from the Romanian cover version by Fanfare Ciocărlia was used in the song We No Speak Americano by Yolanda Be Cool.

See also
List of 1930s jazz standards

External links and references

1936 songs
1936 singles
Songs with music by Juan Tizol
Songs with lyrics by Irving Mills
Jazz songs
Exotica
1930s jazz standards
Swing jazz standards
Nat King Cole songs
Santo & Johnny songs
Jazz compositions in F minor
Songs with music by Duke Ellington